The Christian Standard Bible (CSB) is a translation of the Bible in contemporary English. Published by Holman Bible Publishers in 2017 as the successor to the Holman Christian Standard Bible (HCSB), the CSB "incorporates advances in biblical scholarship and input from Bible scholars, pastors, and readers to sharpen both accuracy and readability." The CSB relies on recently published critical editions of the original Hebrew, Aramaic, and Greek texts.

Work on the CSB was completed in June 2016, with the first full edition released in March 2017.

History 
The Christian Standard Bible is a major revision of the 2009 edition of the Holman Christian Standard Bible (HCSB). The CSB incorporates advances in biblical scholarship to improve upon translation decisions, word choice, and style. It also removes some of the novel features of the HCSB, such as consistently translating the tetragrammaton as "Lord" rather than "Yahweh" and using "brothers and sisters" for the plural term "brothers" in Greek.

The HCSB was translated by an international team of 100 scholars from 17 denominations. The HCSB New Testament was released in 1999, and the entire translation was released in 2004.

Work on the CSB revision was undertaken by the Translation and Review Team, a trans-denominational group of 21 conservative Evangelical Christian biblical scholars. Backgrounds represented include Southern Baptist, Lutheran, Presbyterian, conservative Anglican, and non-denominational Evangelical churches.

Ongoing translation decisions are governed by the ten member CSB Translation Oversight Committee, co-chaired by Thomas R. Schreiner and David L. Allen.

In February 2020, an update to the translation (CSB Text Edition: 2020) was released. Adjustments affected less than 1% of the 2017 text, and focused on edits to footnotes, cross references, punctuation, and word/phrase choices. The Translation Oversight Committee provided specific explanation about their decision to translate hilasterion in Romans 3:25 as "mercy seat" rather than the 2017 rendering of "atoning sacrifice" or the traditional rendering in English Bibles, "propitiation."

Translation philosophy 
The CSB (and original HCSB) translators used a methodology they termed "Optimal Equivalence." Optimal Equivalence draws from both formal and dynamic translation philosophies, balancing contemporary English readability with linguistic precision to the original languages.

Based upon criteria from a quantitative linguistic comparison of eight popular English Bible translations, the CSB was found, according to Andi Wu of the Global Bible Initiative, to hold the most optimal balance of Readable vs. Literal scores.

Textual basis 
The CSB Translation and Review Team used the latest available Greek, Hebrew, and Aramaic texts. The Biblia Hebraica Stuttgartensia 5th Edition (BHS5) was used for the Old Testament and the Novum Testamentum Graece 28th Edition (NA28; i.e., the Nestle-Aland 28th edition) and United Bible Societies 5th Edition (UBS5) was used for the New Testament (the HCSB used BHS4 and NA27/UBS4).

See also 
 Modern English Bible translations

Notes

References

External links 
 

2017 books
2017 in Christianity
Bible translations into English